The EH10 class of electric locomotives were Bo′Bo′+Bo′Bo′ wheel arrangement two-unit DC freight locomotives operated by Japanese National Railways (JNR) in Japan from 1954 until 1982.

The exterior was designed by industrial designer Masao Hagiwara.

The EH10 was used for 1,200 tonne freight trains on the Tōkaidō Main Line between Tokyo (Shiodome) and Osaka (Umeda).

Preserved examples
One example, EH10 61, is preserved at Higashi-Awaji Minami Park in Osaka.

Classification

The EH0 classification for this locomotive type is explained below.
 E: Electric locomotive
 H: Eight driving axles
 10: Locomotive with a maximum speed of 85 km/h or less

See also
 JR Freight Class EH200
 JR Freight Class EH500
 JR Freight Class EH800

References

1500 V DC locomotives
Electric locomotives of Japan
Bo′Bo′+Bo′Bo′ locomotives
1067 mm gauge locomotives of Japan
Preserved electric locomotives
Railway locomotives introduced in 1954
Toshiba locomotives
Hitachi locomotives
Kawasaki locomotives